Francis Roy Crawford (23 December 1917 – 29 July 1996) was a New Zealand cricketer who played first-class cricket for Wellington from 1937 to 1948.

Roy Crawford was a middle-order batsman and leg-spin bowler. He top-scored for Wellington with 12 and 40 when they were defeated by an innings by the touring Australians in 1945–46. Earlier that season he had also top-scored for Wellington with 55 (out of a total of 130) and 19 when Auckland beat them by an innings.

He married Grace Maher, and served in the Royal New Zealand Air Force in World War II with the rank of leading aircraftman.

References

External links
 
 Roy Crawford at CricketArchive

1917 births
1996 deaths 
New Zealand cricketers
Wellington cricketers
Cricketers from Wellington City
New Zealand military personnel of World War II
Royal New Zealand Air Force cricketers
New Zealand Services cricketers